A video recorder may be any of several related devices:

Digital video recorder (DVR); Personal video recorder (PVR)
DVD recorder
Videocassette recorder (VCR)
Video tape recorder (VTR)